Libong (also Libong I) is a village in the commune of Tignère in the Adamawa Region of Cameroon.

Population 
In 1971,  Libong contained 95 inhabitants, mainly Fula people.

At the time of the 2005 census, there were 318 people in the village.

References

Bibliography 
 Jean Boutrais (ed.), Peuples et cultures de l'Adamaoua (Cameroun) : actes du colloque de Ngaoundéré, du 14 au 16 janvier 1992, ORSTOM, Paris ; Ngaoundéré-Anthropos, 1993, 316 p. 
 Dictionnaire des villages de l'Adamaoua, ONAREST, Yaoundé, October 1974, 133 p.

External links 
 Tignère, sur le site Communes et villes unies du Cameroun (CVUC)

Populated places in Adamawa Region